Ramapayare Rabidas is a Bharatiya Janata Party politician from Assam. He has been elected in Assam Legislative Assembly election in 1991 from Ratabari constituency.

References 

Living people
Bharatiya Janata Party politicians from Assam
21st-century Indian politicians
Assam MLAs 1991–1996
People from Karimganj district
Year of birth missing (living people)